Amblyseius kaguya is a species of mite in the family Phytoseiidae.

References

kaguya
Articles created by Qbugbot
Animals described in 1966